William Alnwick (died 1449)  was an English Catholic clergyman. He was Bishop of Norwich (1426–1436) and Bishop of Lincoln (1436–1449).

Educated at Cambridge, Alnwick was an ecclesiastic priest.  He was probably the same hermit who lived in the St Benet's Chapel that was screened off as part of Westminster Abbey.  On the night of 20 March 1413, as King Henry IV lay dying in the Jerusalem Chamber, his son and heir apparent Prince Henry wandered the precincts and spoke to Alnwick. On 20 March 1415, Alnwick was appointed as confessor-general of Syon Abbey, but after a year returned to Westminster.  During Henry V's reign he became Archdeacon of Salisbury, but by early 1421 had been appointed King's Secretary, and is recorded as attending Privy Council meetings.  In the new reign he was forced to surrender his seals of office to Parliament before being named Keeper of the Privy Seal on 19 December 1422. He had custody of the seal until 24 February 1432.

Alnwick was nominated to the see of Norwich on 27 February 1426 and consecrated on 18 August 1426. He was translated to the see of Lincoln on 19 September 1436.

While bishop Alnwick built the east wing of bishop's palace at Lincoln, with chapel and dining-parlour and a gateway tower.

While at Lincoln Alnwick attempted a resolution of a dispute within the cathedral, producing an elaborate arbitration. He then reviewed the whole body of statutes of the diocese, then largely unaltered since the Norman Conquest, creating an improved one. He finished this by 1440, but the dean of the cathedral was hostile, and they argued over the implementation of the reforms until Alnwick's death.

Alnwick was an assiduous heresy-hunter, and persecutor of the Lollards, punishing them with imprisonment, forced entry into monasteries and, in at least one case, execution. He twice tried Margery Baxter who was sentenced to be flogged in church and in public. He also tried Hawise Mone (fl. 1428–1430) and they both agreed to recant their heresies.

Alnwick was involved in the foundation and building of Eton College and King's College, Cambridge, as well as modifying Norwich and Lincoln Cathedrals, and the palaces in both of the dioceses of which he was bishop.

He died in 1449, and was buried in Lincoln Cathedral with a lengthy epitaph, now destroyed, recording his virtues. In his will he left money to St Michael's Church, Alnwick, as well as vestments, a missal, an antiphoner, and a chalice. 

Alnwick died in office as  Bishop of Lincoln on 5 December 1449. 

His executors are listed as: John Breton, of Therfeld, parson; John Wygnell, master & doctor of decretals; Thomas Dunken, of Chalfhunt, master & parson; Thomas Twyer, master & parson

Citations

References

 Bishops of Lincoln accessed on 21 October 2007
 
 

Bishops of Norwich
Bishops of Lincoln
15th-century English Roman Catholic bishops
Lords Privy Seal
1449 deaths
Year of birth unknown